The Nangchen horse is a small breed of horse native to the Kham region of northern Tibet, thought to have been bred pure since the 9th century. They became known to the western world in 1994 due to the exploration of French anthropologist Michel Peissel.

These animals are said to contain no ancestry from any of the common sources for most other Tibetan pony breeds, neither Mongolian horse, Arabian nor any type of Turkish blood. They are powerful and fast, said to have many of the characteristics of a modern racehorse.  They have refined features, are pony-sized, but tall for ponies, swift and agile.  Their unique characteristics include adaptations to the very high altitude of the region, including enlarged lungs.

In 1995, Peissel returned to Tibet in hopes of purchasing some individual animals to study in more detail, but they were unable to do so due to the high prices asked for the animals by local residents.  On their way back, Peissel's expedition took an alternate route through a remote area and observed the Riwoche horse.

See also
Tibetan pony
Riwoche horse
List of megafauna discovered in modern times

References

Simons, Marlise. "A Stone-Age Horse Still Roams a Tibetan Plateau." New York Times,  November 12, 1995
 Hilchey, Tim. "Purebred Horse Unknown to West Is Reported in Highlands of Tibet."  New York Times, Tuesday, May 24, 1994

Peissel, Michel. "Reserve on the roof of the world" Geographical, April, 1999
Hays, Jeffrey.  "Tibetan Animals and Plants." Facts and Details 2008.
  Cannell, Harry. "Chámă Gŭdaò –Tibet and the Tea-Horse Road."  Aurlaea, July 18, 2009

Horse breeds
Horse breeds originating in Tibet